Fernie Alpine Resort is a ski resort, located on Lizard Range, near the town of Fernie, British Columbia in Canada. The resort also operates a mountain bike park, hiking, guided hikes, and sightseeing in the summer months.

Fernie Alpine Resort is owned by Resorts of the Canadian Rockies, which also owns ski areas Kimberley Alpine Resort, Kicking Horse Resort, Nakiska, Mont Sainte-Anne, and Stoneham.

History 
Fernie Alpine Resort was originally called "Fernie Snow Valley" before being sold in 1997 to RCR (Resort of the Canadian Rockies). RCR saw some financial trouble under owner Charlie Locke, and after a period in bankruptcy protection, was bailed out by Alberta billionaire N. Murray Edwards.

During spring 2009, Fernie Alpine Resort was transformed into the fictional Kodiak Valley ski resort, ca. 1986, for exterior location shots of the Hollywood film Hot Tub Time Machine. The film was released in March 2010.

Bowls
Fernie Alpine Resort has five bowls along the Lizard Range. Siberia Bowl, Cedar Bowl, Timber Bowl, Currie Bowl, and the Lizard bowl.

References

External links
 Fernie Alpine Resort
 RCR corporate website

Elk Valley (British Columbia)
Ski areas and resorts in British Columbia
Tourism in British Columbia